Louis Janssens (October 24, 1876 – April 14, 1950) was a Belgian Catholic priest, missionary, and Bishop of the Roman Catholic Diocese of Jehol between 1942 and 1948.

Biography
Louis Janssens was born in Belgium, on October 24, 1876. He was ordained a priest on July 14, 1901. He came Mongolia to preach in October 1903. On February 24, 1939, he became Vicar Apostolic of Jehol. When the People's Liberation Army controlled the area, he took refuge in Beiping. On January 9, 1948, he returned to Belgium after resignation.

On April 14, 1950, he died in Antwerp, Flemish Region, aged 73.

References

1876 births
1950 deaths
20th-century Belgian Roman Catholic priests
20th-century Roman Catholic bishops in China